King Levinsky (10 September 1910 – 30 September 1991), also known as Kingfish Levinsky, was an American heavyweight boxer who fought during the 1930s.  He was born Harris Kraków and was a member of the Kraków fish-selling family of Maxwell Street, in Chicago's old Jewish ghetto.

Professional career

Notable opposition
Levinsky was a rated heavyweight whose biggest wins came against ex-heavyweight champion Jack Sharkey on a 10-round decision, and ex-lightheavyweight champion Tommy Loughran, also on a decision.  He was defeated twice by Primo Carnera, and also lost to Max Baer.  Although he never fought for the title, Levinsky faced all of the top fighters of his era.

Levinsky is best remembered for "freezing" in his fight with Joe Louis, who knocked him out in the first round.  On February 18, 1931, Levinsky also fought a 4-round exhibition with Jack Dempsey.  Dempsey had embarked on a tour of exhibition bouts and was contemplating a comeback.  The Levinsky fight convinced him that he was through as a fighter.

Marketability
A May 1932 Time Magazine article stated:  "If you defined the efficiency of a prize-fighter by his ability in the ring, Harry Krakow ('Kingfish Levinsky') would not rate better than tenth among U. S. heavyweights. Last year he had 15 fights, won only eight. If you defined efficiency as a fighter's ability to earn money at his trade, Kingfish Levinsky might rank as best fighter in the U. S. In the last 15 months, gates at his fights with Slattery, Griffiths, Carnera, Paulino and an exhibition bout against Jack Dempsey have amounted to $254,124.68. He may this year earn more than Schmeling, Sharkey, Dempsey, Carnera or Schaaf. Kingfish Levinsky's earning power is due partly to an engaging slapstick manner in the ring, an engaging entourage.... It is due partly to the fact that most of Levinsky's fights have been in Chicago, where everyone knows that he grew up on the West Side and entered the fish-peddling business with a pushcart on Maxwell Street."

For a portion of his career, Levinsky was managed by his sister Lena (Kraków) Levy.  Known as "Leapin Lena", she was a colorful character who swore like a sailor, and rooted loudly for her brother during his bouts. Esquire magazine, in its February 1939 issue, included an article profiling his new career as a professional wrestler.

Life after boxing
Levinsky served in the US Army during World War II. In his later years he worked as a tie salesman in Miami Beach, Florida.
He was married to fan dancer Roxana Sand for just over a month in 1934.

Professional boxing record
All information in this section is derived from BoxRec, unless otherwise stated.

Official record

All newspaper decisions are officially regarded as “no decision” bouts and are not counted in the win/loss/draw column.

Unofficial record

Record with the inclusion of newspaper decisions in the win/loss/draw column.

References

External links

Boxers from Illinois
Heavyweight boxers
Jewish American boxers
Jewish boxers
1910 births
1991 deaths
American male boxers
20th-century American Jews